Andrea Zuvich (born September 1985) is an American historian, historical consultant, and author of historical fiction. She specialises in the House of Stuart during the latter half of the 17th-century. Zuvich is the founder of the website The Seventeenth Century Lady and is one of the most-followed historians on Twitter.

Biography
She was educated in both History and Anthropology at the University of Central Florida.

In 2013, Endeavour Press published Zuvich's debut, His Last Mistress, a biographical fiction novel about the Duke of Monmouth's last and most important relationship. In 2014, she was on BBC Radio 4's Woman's Hour, discussing the importance of Queen Anne, the last Stuart monarch. Zuvich was one of the original developers of the award-winning Garden History Tours at Kensington Palace.

Besides publishing two historical fiction novels and one history book, Zuvich has also contributed a novella, "The Chambermaid" in the Steel and Lace Anthology. She has also written articles, including "The Allure of the Royal Mistress"  for The Huffington Post UK, and "Five Things You (Probably) Didn't Know About The Stuarts" for History Scotland.

Zuvich is married and lives in Bolsover, Derbyshire.

Published works

Non fiction
 The Stuarts in 100 Facts. Amberley Publishing, Stroud, 2015. 
 A Year in the Life of Stuart Britain, Amberley Publishing, Stroud. Expected release 2016.

Fiction
 His Last Mistress: The Duke of Monmouth and Lady Henrietta Wentworth. London, Endeavour Press 
 The Stuart Vampire: A Gothic Novel. London, The Seventeenth Century Lady. ASIN B00GBN90O2

References

American emigrants to England
Living people
British historians
21st-century American historians
Writers from Philadelphia
Chilean people of Spanish descent
American women historians
1985 births
University of Central Florida alumni
Place of birth missing (living people)
Hispanic and Latino American novelists
Historians of England
English historical novelists
Women historical novelists
Novelists from Pennsylvania
Historians from Pennsylvania
21st-century American women writers
British women historians